is Morning Musume's ninth original studio album, released approximately two years after their previous album, Sexy 8 Beat. It was released on March 18, 2009 in both limited (EPCE-5629) and regular (EPCE-5631) editions. The limited edition comes with a bonus DVD. The regular edition include one of ten photo cards, there is one for each member and one for the whole group.

Track listing

Featured lineup 
 4th generation: Hitomi Yoshizawa (uncredited in Track 13)
 5th generation: Ai Takahashi, Risa Niigaki
 6th generation: Eri Kamei, Sayumi Michishige, Reina Tanaka, Miki Fujimoto (uncredited in Track 13)
 7th generation: Koharu Kusumi
 8th generation: Aika Mitsui, Junjun, Linlin

Personnel 
 Lyrics, Composition: Tsunku
 Arrangement: Nao Tanaka (tracks 1, 4, 10), Hideyuki "Daichi" Suzuki (2, 8, 9), Koichi Yuasa (3, 6), Kaoru Okubo (5, 7), Kōtarō Egami (11, 12), Jun Yamazaki (13)
 Tenor Saxophone: Yoshinari Takejō (2)
 Saxophone: Akio Suzuki (11)
 Guitar: Koji Kamata (2, 3, 4, 5, 6, 7, 8, 9, 10, 11)
 Chorus: Chino (2, 3, 5, 11), Hiroaki Takeuchi (3), Atsuko Inaba (12)

Oricon ranks and sales

References

External links 
 Platinum 9 Disc entry on the Hello! Project official website 
 J-Ongaku: Platinum 9 Disc

2009 albums
Morning Musume albums
Zetima albums